Miguel Quiame (born 17 September 1991) is an Angolan international footballer who plays professionally as a left back for AD Mação in Portugal.

Career
Born in Luanda, Quiame has played club football for Académica Soyo, Petro Atlético, AEL Limassol, Benfica Luanda, Inter de Luanda and Recreativo do Libolo.

He made his international debut for Angola in 2010, and he has appeared in FIFA World Cup qualifying matches for them.

References

1991 births
Living people
Footballers from Luanda
Angolan footballers
Angola international footballers
Académica Petróleo Kwanda Soyo players
Atlético Petróleos de Luanda players
AEL Limassol players
S.L. Benfica (Luanda) players
G.D. Interclube players
C.R.D. Libolo players
Progresso Associação do Sambizanga players
Cypriot First Division players
Association football fullbacks
2012 Africa Cup of Nations players
2013 Africa Cup of Nations players
Angolan expatriate footballers
Angolan expatriate sportspeople in Cyprus
Expatriate footballers in Cyprus
2011 African Nations Championship players
Angola A' international footballers
2016 African Nations Championship players